Stixis suaveolens  is a species of liana in the family Resedaceae; no subspecies are listed in the Catalogue of Life.  It is found in India, southern China and Indo-China; in Vietnam it may be called cây tôn nấm. In Assamese it is called "Madhoi Maloti"

References

External links
 
 Illustrations Viet Nam (ydvn.net)

suaveolens
Flora of Indo-China
Taxa named by William Roxburgh